Georges Samné (also Georges Samneh ; May 15, 1877 – December 9, 1938) was a Syrian nationalist Francophone medical doctor, intellectual, French colonial publicist, and writer. In 1917, he co-founded the Comité Central Syrien together with Chekri Ganem

Biography 
Samné was born in Mansura, Egypt, on May 15, 1877, to Greek Orthodox parents of Syrian descent.

Samné participated in scholarly and political societies, where he debated the unique role of French colonialism and expansion in the acculturation of the world. He pushed for the French expansion into the Orient. During World War I, he served as advisor to the French government for Syrian affairs, lobbying for the cessation of Greater Syria from the Ottoman Empire. Samné was a supporter of French colonialism. He believed that a universal approach to treating diseases does not suit colonialized peoples, and touted the role of "French women" in spreading "woman to woman" hygiene and public health education to colonized Muslim Tuareg and Bedouin tribes. In August 1908, he founded with his Lebanese friend Chekri Ganem the Société des amis de l'Orient. The organization's goals were to promote French interests in the Levant, and to circulate news about the Near East, through the society's bulletin, the Correspondance d'Orient. He was a founding member of the Central Syrian Committee, which lobbied for the independence and the unity of Syria.

Bibliography

In history and politics 

 La vie politique orientale en 1909 (1910)
 Le Liban autonome (de 1861 à nos jours) (1919)
 La question sioniste (1919)
 Le Chérifat de La Mecque et l'unité syrienne (1919)
 L'effort syrien pendant la Guerre (1919)
 La Khalifat et le Panislamisme (1919)
 La Syrie (1920)
 Raymond Poincaré; politique et personnel de la IIIe république (1933)
 Au Pays du chérif

In medicine 

 Les insuffisances de la croissance (1904)

References 

Syrian writers
Syrian journalists
Arabs from the Ottoman Empire
Syrian nationalists
20th-century Syrian people
Political activists by nationality
1877 births
1938 deaths